Ectemnius lapidarius is a species of square-headed wasp in the family Crabronidae. It is found in Africa, Europe and Northern Asia (excluding China), North America, and Southern Asia.

References

Further reading

 
 
 

Crabronidae
Insects described in 1803